Andrei Merinov (born 23 June 1971) is a former professional tennis player from Russia.

Career
Merinov was a national junior champion in 1989 and turned professional at the age of 19.

He and partner Vladimir Gabrichidze were doubles semi-finalists in the 1992 Kremlin Cup. At the same event the following year, Merinov reached the quarter-finals in the singles.

The Russian lost to Lionel Roux in the opening round of the 1997 French Open. It would be his only Grand Slam appearance.

He won three Challenger titles during his career and was a doubles runner-up on no less than 10 occasions.

Challenger Titles

Singles: (2)

Doubles: (1)

References

1971 births
Living people
Russian male tennis players
Tennis players from Moscow
Soviet male tennis players